Joseph Kagûnda  is an Anglican bishop in Kenya: he has been Bishop of Mount Kenya West since 2004.

References

21st-century Anglican bishops of the Anglican Church of Kenya
Anglican bishops of Mount Kenya West
Year of birth missing (living people)
Living people